Albert Gallatin was a U.S. Revenue Cutter that grounded on Boo Hoo Ledge off Manchester, MA on 6 January 1892.

History
Named after President Thomas Jefferson's Secretary of the Treasury, the Albert Gallatin was built in Buffalo, New York in 1871 at a cost of $65,000. The initial propulsion was a horizontal, direct-acting steam engine with a Fowler steering propeller which was removed in 1874.

Albert Gallatin was ported in Boston Harbor and patrolled from Portsmouth, NH to Holmes Hole, MA. Captain Gabrielson also skippered the Revenue Cutter Dexter when it came to the aid of City of Columbus which wrecked off Martha's Vineyard.

The shipwreck
In the morning of 6 January 1892, Capt. Gabrielson was attempting to make the safety of Gloucester Harbor during a snowstorm and became disoriented. The cutter hit Boo Hoo Ledge hard. While trying to free the ship of the ledge the ship flooded and the smokestack fell onto the ship, killing the ship's carpenter, Mr. J. Jacobson. The other 39 members of the crew were rescued. At the time of her sinking, Gallatin was armed with two 20-pound Dahlgren guns on Marsilly carriages. In small arms, she had new Lee magazine rifles and other pistols cited in Barnstable (MA) Patriot, 12 January 1892.

External links
 
 
 

Shipwrecks of the Massachusetts coast
Sailing ships of the United States
Cutters of the United States Navy
Steamships of the United States Navy
Ships built in Buffalo, New York
1871 ships
Maritime incidents in 1892